The Atteriini are a tribe of tortrix moths.

Genera
 Anacrusis
 Archipimima
 Atteria
 Holoptygma
 Sisurcana
 Templemania
 Tina
 Tinacrucis

Unplaced species 
Capua ruficapilla Meyrick, 1932

References 

 , 2005: World catalogue of insects volume 5 Tortricidae.
 , 2011: Systematic and faunistic data on Neotropical Tortricidae: Phricanthini, Tortricini, Atteriini, Polyorthini, Chlidanotini (Lepidoptera: Tortricidae). Shilap Revista de Lepidopterologia 39 (154): 161-181.
 , 2006: Tortricidae from Venezuela (Lepidoptera: Tortricidae). Shilap Revista de Lepidopterologia 34 133): 35-79 
 , 2010: Tortricidae (Lepidoptera) from Peru. Acta Zoologica Cracoviensia 53B (1-2): 73-159. . Full article:  .

 
Moth tribes